Kanchanaa Moitra is a Bengali film actress. She is a politician from Bharatiya Janata Party

Acting career 
Moitra acted in 2008 Bengali film Sedin Dujone directed by Atanu Bose, but she came into prominence after her 2011 film Bye Bye Bangkok. In 2012 she acted in few more discussed films like Kayekti Meyer Golpo of Subrata Sen, Accident directed by  Nandita Roy and Shiboprosad Mukherjee.

Filmography 
 Jaanbaaz (2019)
 Bilu Rakkhosh (2017)
 Kiriti Roy (2016)
 Shajarur Kanta (2015)
 Bristi Bheja Roddur
 10 July (2012)
 Accident (2012)
 Kayekti Meyer Golpo (2012)
 8:08 Er Bongaon Local (2012)
 Bye Bye Bangkok (2011)
 Pakhi (2009)
 Sedin Dujone (2008)

Television

See also 
 Mishmee Das
 Rajib Basu
 Rupanjana Mitra
 Anjana Basu
 Debolina Dutta

References

Notes

Citation

External links 
 

Living people
Actresses in Bengali cinema
Actresses from Kolkata
Indian film actresses
Indian television actresses
Bengali television actresses
21st-century Indian actresses
Bharatiya Janata Party politicians from West Bengal
Year of birth missing (living people)